Hinduism is a minority religion in Guadeloupe, followed by some Indo-Guadeloupeans. According to a statistics data, Hinduism is practised by 0.5% of the people in Guadeloupe.

Temples
There are a sizeable number of Hindu Tamil temples that are located in Basse-Terre, and other regions. There is a Hindu temple in dravidian style in Changy in Basse Terre and another one in Gaschet in Grande-Terre

Demographics
Although the Indo-Guadeloupeans constitute about 14% of the Guadeloupe, only some of them are still Hindus. Most of the Indo-Guadelopeans are Catholics, but they also worship Hindu gods. Ernest Moutoussamy, first Indo-Guadelopean member of the French Parliament said in an interview that "Though we are Catholics, we still have images of Hindu gods at home. We celebrate all the Christian festivals but we don’t celebrate Deepavali."

Revival
Revival of Hinduism happened in the last few decades. Many associations for the promotion of Hinduism and Indian culture have appeared during the 90's. The Institut du Monde Indien (Institute for the study of the Indian world) was begun by Jacques Sidambarom, Jean-Claude Petapermal and Roland Gopy to resuscitate Hindu rituals and connect Hindus in Trinidad and Tobago, Reunion, Pondicherry and Paris. Temples were also constructed as a part of it. Hindu religious rituals were also reactivated. Hindu festivals like Diwali and Pongal were also started celebrating.

See also
Hinduism in Martinique
Hinduism in Réunion
Hinduism in France

References

Religion in Guadeloupe
 
Guadeloupe
Guadeloupe